The 2015 Dutch National Track Championships were the Dutch national Championship for track cycling, organized by the KNWU. They took place in Alkmaar, the Netherlands on 20, 28 and 29 December 2015

Medal summary

References

External links
Official event website

Dutch National track cycling championships
2015 in track cycling
Track cycling
Cycling in Alkmaar